Gurkirat Singh (born 16 July 2003) is an Indian professional footballer who plays as a forward for Indian Super League club Mumbai City and for the India national football team. He is considered as one of the best young players in India.

Career statistics

Club

Honours

India U-20
OFC Youth Development Tournament: 2019
SAFF U-20 Championship: 2022

Individual
 2022 SAFF U-20 Championship Most Valuable Player
 2022 SAFF U-20 Championship Top Scorer
Mumbai City
 Indian Super League (Premiership): 2022–23

References

External links

Gurkirat Singh at the-aiff.com

2003 births
Living people
Indian footballers
India youth international footballers
Association football midfielders
Footballers from Chandigarh
Indian Arrows players
I-League players
Mumbai City FC players
Indian Super League players